Events from the year 1889 in China.

Incumbents
 Guangxu Emperor (16th year)
 Regent: Empress Dowager Cixi

Events 
 Consort Jin, probably received the Jadeite Cabbage as part of her dowry for her wedding to Emperor Guangxu.

References